Şemşat Amangylyjowna Annagylyjowa is a Turkmen politician who has served as the education minister of Turkmenistan since the president, Saparmyrat Nyýazow, appointed her on 25 January 2006.

References

Living people
Year of birth missing (living people)
Place of birth missing (living people)
Government ministers of Turkmenistan
Education ministers of Turkmenistan
Women government ministers of Turkmenistan
21st-century Turkmenistan women politicians
21st-century Turkmenistan politicians
20th-century Turkmenistan women